Nymphicula albibasalis is a moth in the family Crambidae. It was described by Yoshiyasu in 1980. It is found in Japan (Kyushu, Shikoku).

The length of the forewings is 5.5 mm for males and 5.3-6.3 mm for females. The forewings are pale orange, but fuscous from the base to the white antemedial band. The basal third of the hindwings is white. The intermediate area is fuscous, with a dark silvery grey tornal marking tinged with a small orange speckle.

References

Nymphicula
Moths described in 1980